Lancashire Cricket Board played in List A cricket matches between 1999 and 2002. This is a list of the players who appeared in those matches.

James Anderson (2000): JM Anderson
John Armstrong (2002): JM Armstrong
Neil Bannister (2000): NDR Bannister
Christopher Barrow (2001): CM Barrow
Stuart Catterall (2000–2002): SC Catterall
Steven Croft (2002): SJ Croft
Gareth Cross (2002): GD Cross
Stephen Dearden (1999–2002): SE Dearden
Russell Edmonds (2000): RS Edmonds
Damian Eyre (1999–2001): DR Eyre
Darron Foy (1999–2000): DT Foy
Paul Green (1999–2002): P Green
Jonathon Harvey (1999–2001): JD Harvey
David Heyes (1999–2000): DJ Heyes
Roland Horridge (1999–2001): REWG Horridge
Paul Horton (2002): PJ Horton
Irfan Rana (2001): Irfan Rana
Graham Knowles (2000–2002): GA Knowles
Mark Lomas (1999–2001): MC Lomas
Sajid Mahmood (2001): SI Mahmood
Andrew Mercer (2002): AJ Mercer
Oliver Newby (2002): OJ Newby
Steven Oddy (2001): SC Oddy
Matthew Parkinson (1999): ME Parkinson
Gavin Reynolds (2001): G Reynolds
David Snellgrove (1999–2002): DR Snellgrove
Matthew Taylor (2000): M Taylor
Phil Unsworth (2001): PN Unsworth
Duncan Whalley (2001): RD Whalley
David White (1999): DG White

References

Lancashire Cricket Board